The Ministry of Land and Property Relations  is an agency of the government of Bashkortostan, headquartered in Soviet Square, Ufa.

Some functions
Certification cadastral engineers 
Reception of applications and issuance of documents on the coordination of projects of land parcel boundaries 
Participation in state regulation of land relations, development and implementation of land reform programs, government programs related to real estate.
Accounting for state property and division of property
Privatization of State Property of the Republic of Bashkortostan

Ministers 
After the 2018 Head of the Ministry has been Oleg Polstovalov.

Notes and references

External links
  Republic of Bashkortostan Ministry of Land and Property Relations Official Website in Russian

Politics of Bashkortostan
Government ministries of Bashkortostan